Ansar Howara Sporting Club  is a Lebanese football club based in Houara, Lebanon, that competes in the .

History 
Founded in 1988, the club gained promotion to the Lebanese Second Division in 2019. They were relegated back to the Lebanese Third Division, after finishing last in the 2020–21 season.

See also 
 List of football clubs in Lebanon

References 

Football clubs in Lebanon
Association football clubs established in 1988
1988 establishments in Lebanon